Padraig McCrory (born Jun 20, 1988) is an Irish professional boxer.

Professional career
McCrory has competed at Super Middleweight, Light Heavyweight and Cruiserweight in his professional career, capturing the WBC International Silver Super Middleweight and IBO Light Heavyweight titles.

Professional boxing record

References

Living people
1988 births
Irish male boxers
Light-heavyweight boxers
International Boxing Organization champions